The St Boniface Riels are a junior ice hockey team based in Winnipeg, Manitoba, Canada. Founded in 1971, they are part of the Manitoba Major Junior Hockey League (MMJHL).

Season-by-season record
Note: W = Wins, L = Losses, T = Ties, OTL = Overtime Losses, GF = Goals for, GA = Goals against

League championships

Jack Mackenzie Trophy (playoffs) 
 1971-72, 1972–73, 1984–85, 1985–86, 2014–15

Art Moug Trophy (regular season)
 1971-72, 1972–73, 1975–76, 1981–82, 1984–85, 1985–86, 2013–14

References

External links
 Official team website
 @rielsMMJHL

Ice hockey teams in Winnipeg
1971 establishments in Manitoba
Riels